is a Japanese artistic gymnast. She was part of the silver medalling team at the 2015 Summer Universiade where she also won a bronze medal in the individual all-around competition. Sasada also competed for Japan in the first ever Youth Olympic Games in 2010.

References

Japanese female artistic gymnasts
1995 births
Gymnasts from Tokyo
Gymnasts at the 2010 Summer Youth Olympics
Universiade medalists in gymnastics
Living people
Universiade silver medalists for Japan
Universiade bronze medalists for Japan
Medalists at the 2015 Summer Universiade
Medalists at the 2017 Summer Universiade
21st-century Japanese women